Deborah Grant (born Deborah Jane Snelling; 22 February 1947) is an English actress. Between 1981 and 1991, she played Deborah Bergerac in the BBC television detective series Bergerac. Since 2007, she has appeared in the sitcom Not Going Out as Wendy Adams, the mother of Tim (Tim Vine) and Lucy (Sally Bretton).

Personal life and training

Grant was born in Perivale to Henry Percival and Henrietta (formerly Finn) Snelling.

She trained at the Central School of Speech and Drama and appeared on stage at the Bristol Old Vic and in the West End of London. She has since had a successful television acting career.

She has been married twice. She became Lady Child in 1971 when she married the baronet and actor Jeremy Child by whom she has a daughter. After their divorce, she married actor Gregory Floy and had a daughter.

Television appearances
 Public Eye - Rosemary, in the episode "A Fixed Address"
 Edward the Seventh - young Princess Alexandra of Denmark/Princess of Wales 
 The Power Game
 Danger UXB
 Crown Prosecutor
 Jonathan Creek
 Brum - police lady
 Bread
 UFO - Linda Simmonds in the episode "The Psychobombs" (1970)
 Casualty
 Doctors
 Peak Practice - receptionist Carol Johnson
 Howards' Way
 Bergerac - Deborah, ex-wife of John Nettles' character.
 Bouquet of Barbed Wire - Sarah Francis
 Another Bouquet - Sarah Roberts (née Francis), alongside Frank Finlay
 Minder - Lady Ingrave in You Gotta Have Friends (series 1)
  Room at the Bottom - Celia Pagett-Smythe
 Victoria Wood As Seen On TV
 Victoria Wood
 Outside Edge
 Pat and Margaret - Stella Kincaid
 Not Going Out - Wendy Adams, Lucy and Tim's mother
 Mr Palfrey of Westminster - Yelena

Theatre appearances
 Barnum (1983), with Michael Crawford at the London Palladium

Film appearances
I Want What I Want (1972)
Scandal (1989) - Valerie Hobson
Aces Go Places V (1989) - Deborah
London Has Fallen (2016) - Doris

References

External links

1947 births
Living people
Alumni of the Royal Central School of Speech and Drama
People from Brentford
English stage actresses
English television actresses
Actresses from London
Wives of baronets